The British Cycling Hall of Fame was established in 2009 as part of British Cycling's 50th anniversary celebrations.

On 17 December 2009, the names of fifty one people involved in cycling to be inducted into the British Cycling Hall of Fame were announced. The selection panel, whose job it was to whittle the names down from 300 nominations, consisted of Brian Cookson, William Fotheringham, Robert Garbutt, Peter King, Victoria Pendleton and Hugh Porter.  The inaugural induction ceremony was held on 20 February 2010 at Manchester Central, hosted by television present Dermot Murnaghan.  Further members were inducted in 2014 and 2016.

Members

References

External links

 

Cycle racing in the United Kingdom
Cycling museums and halls of fame
2009 establishments in the United Kingdom
Halls of fame in England